Cheqbook is an American cloud-based accounting software-as-a-service for small-to-medium businesses and independent contractors headquartered in Kahului, Hawaii. Cheqbook automates downloading and categorizing transactions in addition to offering services like invoicing, bill pay, and transactional reporting. The software is available via monthly subscription. Subscriptions are tiered based on the number of companies or books being managed. Accounts can be shared between accountants and business owners.

History 
Cheqbook was founded on December 31, 2010. CEO Doug Levin's CPA firm Levin & Hu CPAs was unable to recommend cloud-based solutions and still recommended the desktop version of Quickbooks. Cheqbook was founded with the purpose of building software that CPAs needed while being intuitive for business owners. Private beta began on April 23, 2012. Cheqbook officially launched on May 17, 2013. The Pro Marketplace for accountants and bookkeepers was launched on July 10, 2013.

Products

Cheqbook
Cheqbook is cloud-based accounting software for small-to-medium businesses. Features include bank synchronization, automatic categorization, invoicing (accounts receivable), bills (accounts payable), check printing, and bank reconciliation.

Pro Marketplace
The Pro Marketplace is a free match-making service that pairs business owners with accountants and bookkeepers in their community.

References 

General

Maui Startup Launches Cloud Accounting Site Cheqbook to Compete with QuickBooks - Wall Street Journal, July 13, 2013
Maui executives launch online accounting site Cheqbook to compete with Quickbooks - Pacific Business News, June 19, 2013

External links
 Official Site

Financial software companies
Accounting software